Rev (also ) or Shalva is a village that is, de facto, in the Askeran Province of the breakaway Republic of Artsakh; de jure, it is in the Khojaly District of Azerbaijan, in the disputed region of Nagorno-Karabakh.

History 
During the Soviet period, the village was a part of the Askeran District of the Nagorno-Karabakh Autonomous Oblast.

Historical heritage sites 
Historical heritage sites in and around the village include an 18th/19th-century cemetery, St. Stephen's Church built in 1894, and a 19th-century spring monument.

Economy and culture 
The population is mainly engaged in agriculture and animal husbandry. As of 2015, the village has a municipal building, a house of culture, and a medical centre. Students study in the secondary school of the neighboring village of Tsaghkashat.

Demographics 
The village has an ethnic Armenian-majority population. It had 113 inhabitants in 2005, and 110 inhabitants in 2015.

Gallery

References

External links 

 

Populated places in Askeran Province
Populated places in Khojaly District